The Ambassador of Latvia to the United States is the official diplomatic representative of the government of Latvia to the government of the United States. The ambassador and their staff are based at the  Embassy of Latvia in Washington, D.C. The official title is His Excellency Ambassador Extraordinary and Plenipotentiary of the Republic of Latvia to the United States of America.

Ambassadors Extraordinary and Plenipotentiary (from 1992) 
 March 11, 1992 (credentials presented) to December 1992: Anatols Dinbergs
1993–1999: Ojārs Ēriks Kalniņš
2000–2004: Aivis Ronis
2004–2007: Māris Riekstiņš
2007–2012: Andrejs Pildegovičs
2013–2016 : Andris Razāns
2016–2019: Andris Teikmanis
2019–    : Māris Selga

References 

Lavtia
 
United States